The Douglas Treaties, also known as the Vancouver Island Treaties or the Fort Victoria Treaties, were a series of treaties signed between certain indigenous groups on Vancouver Island and the Colony of Vancouver Island.

Background
With the signing of the Oregon Treaty in 1846, the Hudson's Bay Company (HBC) determined that its trapping rights in the Oregon Territory were tenuous.  Thus in 1849, it moved its western headquarters from Fort Vancouver on the Columbia River (present day Vancouver, Washington) to Fort Victoria.  Fort Vancouver's Chief Factor, James Douglas, was relocated to the young trading post to oversee the Company's operations west of the Rockies.

This development prompted the British colonial office to designate the territory a crown colony on January 13, 1849.  The new colony, Colony of Vancouver Island, was immediately leased to the HBC for a ten-year period, and Douglas was charged with encouraging British settlement.  Richard Blanshard was named the colony's governor.  Blanshard discovered that the hold of the HBC over the affairs of the new colony was all but absolute, and that it was Douglas who held all practical authority in the territory.  There was no civil service, no police, no militia, and virtually every British colonist was an employee of the HBC.

Treaties

As the colony expanded the HBC started buying up lands for colonial settlement and industry from Aboriginal peoples on Vancouver Island.  For four years the governor, James Douglas, made a series of fourteen land purchases from Aboriginal peoples.

To negotiate the terms, Douglas met first in April 1850 with leaders of the Songhees nation, and made verbal agreements. Each leader made an X at the bottom of a blank ledger. The actual terms of the treaty were only incorporated in August, and modelled on the  New Zealand Company's deeds of purchase for Maori land,  used after the signing of Treaty of Waitangi.

The terms of the treaties promised that they would be able to retain existing village lands and fields for their use, and also would be allowed to hunt and fish on the surrendered lands.

These fourteen land purchases became the fourteen Treaties that make up the Douglas Treaties.  Douglas didn't continue buying land due to lack of money and the slow growth of the Vancouver Island colony. Along with Treaty 8, the Douglas Treaties were the last treaties signed between the crown and the First Nations in British Columbia until Nisga'a Final Agreement.

The treaties are endlessly disputed for a number of reasons and have been subject to numerous court cases. One of the major controversies regarding the treaties is the actual terms of the treaties were left blank at the time of signing and a number of clauses and pages were instead inserted at a later date.

Context

The Treaties were signed during a period of severe cultural destruction in which the Songhees had experienced precipitous population decline, due to the arrival of foreign diseases. The Treaties remain highly controversial given that it is unclear whether the Aboriginal leaders knew exactly what they were signing over.

Treaty members

References

Further reading
 British Columbia Indian Treaties In Historical Perspective, Dennis F. K. Madill, Research Branch, Corporate Policy, Department of Indian and Northern Affairs Canada, 1981

External links
Treaty Texts - Douglas Treaties
Map of Vancouver Island Treaties, Hulquminum Treaty Group website

1850 treaties
1851 treaties
1852 treaties
1853 treaties
First Nations history in British Columbia
History of Vancouver Island
Coast Salish
Kwakwaka'wakw
1854 treaties
Vancouver Island
Treaties of Indigenous peoples in Canada
Treaties of the Colony of Vancouver Island
1850s in Canada